A solar tracker is a device that orients a payload toward the Sun. Payloads are usually solar panels, parabolic troughs, fresnel reflectors, lenses or the mirrors of a heliostat.

For flat-panel photovoltaic systems, trackers are used to minimize the angle of incidence between the incoming sunlight and a photovoltaic panel, sometimes known as the cosine error. Reducing this angle increases the amount of energy produced from a fixed amount of installed power generating capacity. In standard photovoltaic applications, it was predicted in 2008–2009 that trackers could be used in at least 85% of commercial installations greater than one megawatt from 2009 to 2012.

As the pricing, reliability and performance of single-axis trackers have improved, the systems have been installed in an increasing percentage of utility-scale projects. According to data from WoodMackenzie/GTM Research, global solar tracker shipments hit a record 14.5 gigawatts in 2017. This represents growth of 32 percent year-over-year, with similar or greater growth projected as large-scale solar deployment accelerates.

In concentrator photovoltaics (CPV) and concentrated solar power (CSP) applications, trackers are used to enable the optical components in the CPV and CSP systems. The optics in concentrated solar applications accept the direct component of sunlight light and therefore must be oriented appropriately to collect energy. Tracking systems are found in all concentrator applications because such systems collect the sun's energy with maximum efficiency when the optical axis is aligned with incident solar radiation.

Basic concept

Sunlight has two components, the "direct beam" that carries about 90% of the solar energy, and the "diffuse sunlight" that carries the remainder – the diffuse portion is the blue sky on a clear day, and is a larger proportion of the total on cloudy days. As the majority of the energy is in the direct beam, maximizing collection requires the Sun to be visible to the panels for as long as possible. However, on cloudier days the ratio of direct vs. diffuse light can be as low as 60:40 or even lower.

The energy contributed by the direct beam drops off with the cosine of the angle between the incoming light and the panel.  In addition, the reflectance (averaged across all polarizations) is approximately constant for angles of incidence up to around 50°, beyond which reflectance degrades rapidly.

 	
Notes

For example, trackers that have accuracies of ± 5° can deliver greater than 99.6% of the energy delivered by the direct beam plus 100% of the diffuse light. As a result, high accuracy tracking is not typically used in non-concentrating PV applications.

The purpose of a tracking mechanism is to follow the Sun as it moves across the sky. In the following sections, in which each of the main factors are described in a little more detail, the complex path of the Sun is simplified by considering its daily east-west motion separately from its yearly north-south variation with the seasons of the year.

Solar energy intercepted
The amount of solar energy available for collection from the direct beam is the amount of light intercepted by the panel. This is given by the area of the panel multiplied by the cosine of the angle of incidence of the direct beam (see illustration above). Or put another way, the energy intercepted is equivalent to the area of the shadow cast by the panel onto a surface perpendicular to the direct beam.

This cosine relationship is very closely related to the observation formalized in 1760 by Lambert's cosine law. This describes that the observed brightness of an object is proportional to the cosine of the angle of incidence of the light illuminating it.

Reflective losses

Not all of the light intercepted is transmitted into the panel; some is reflected at its surface.  The amount reflected depends on both the refractive index of the surface material and the angle of incidence of the incoming light. The amount reflected also differs depending on the polarization of the incoming light. Incoming sunlight is a mixture of both polarizations, with equal amounts in direct sunlight. Averaged over all polarizations, the reflective losses are approximately constant up to angles of incidence up to around 50° beyond which it degrades rapidly. See for example the accompanying graph, appropriate for glass.

Solar panels are often coated with an anti-reflective coating, which is one or more thin layers of substances with refractive indices intermediate between that of silicon and that of air. This causes destructive interference in the reflected light, diminishing the amount. Photovoltaic manufacturers have been working to decrease reflectance with improved anti-reflective coatings or with textured glass.

Daily east-west motion of the Sun
The Sun travels through 360 degrees east to west per day, but from the perspective of any fixed location the visible portion is 180 degrees during an average 1/2 day period (more in summer; slightly less in spring and fall; significantly less in winter). Local horizon effects reduce this somewhat, making the effective motion about 150 degrees. A solar panel in a fixed orientation between the dawn and sunset extremes will see a motion of 75 degrees to either side, and thus, according to the table above, will lose over 75% of the energy in the morning and evening. Rotating the panels to the east and west can help recapture those losses. A tracker that only attempts to compensate for the east-west movement of the Sun is known as a single-axis tracker.

Seasonal north-south motion of the Sun
Due to the tilt of the Earth's axis, the Sun also moves through 46 degrees north and south during a year. The same set of panels set at the midpoint between the two local extremes will thus see the Sun move 23 degrees on either side. Thus according to the above table, an optimally aligned single-axis tracker (see polar aligned tracker below) will only lose 8.3% at the summer and winter seasonal extremes, or around 5% averaged over a year. Conversely a vertically or horizontally aligned single-axis tracker will lose considerably more as a result of these seasonal variations in the Sun's path. For example, a vertical tracker at a site at 60° latitude will lose up to 40% of the available energy in summer, while a horizontal tracker located at 25° latitude will lose up to 33% in winter.

A tracker that accounts for both the daily and seasonal motions is known as a dual-axis tracker. Generally speaking, the losses due to seasonal angle changes are complicated by changes in the length of the day, increasing collection in the summer in northern or southern latitudes. This biases collection toward the summer, so if the panels are tilted closer to the average summer angles, the total yearly losses are reduced compared to a system tilted at the spring/fall equinox angle (which is the same as the site's latitude).

There is considerable argument within the industry whether the small difference in yearly collection between single and dual-axis trackers makes the added complexity of a two-axis tracker worthwhile. A recent review of actual production statistics from southern Ontario suggested the difference was about 4% in total, which was far less than the added costs of the dual-axis systems. This compares unfavourably with the 24–32% improvement between a fixed-array and single-axis tracker.

Other factors

Clouds
The above models assume uniform likelihood of cloud cover at different times of day or year. In different climate zones cloud cover can vary with seasons, affecting the averaged performance figures described above. Alternatively, for example in an area where cloud cover on average builds up during the day, there can be particular benefits in collecting morning sun.

Atmosphere
The distance that sunlight has to travel through the atmosphere increases as the sun approaches the horizon, as the sunlight has to travel diagonally through the atmosphere. As the path length through the atmosphere increases, the solar intensity reaching the collector decreases. This increasing path length is referred to as the air mass (AM) or air mass coefficient, where AM0 is at the top of the atmosphere, AM1 refers to the direct vertical path down to sea-level with Sun overhead, and AM greater than 1 refers to diagonal paths as the Sun approaches the horizon.

Even though the sun may not feel particularly hot in the early mornings or during the winter months, the diagonal path through the atmosphere has a less than expected impact on the solar intensity. Even when the sun is only 15° above the horizon the solar intensity can be around 60% of its maximum value, around 50% at 10° and 25% at only 5° above the horizon. Therefore, if trackers can follow the Sun from horizon to horizon, then their solar panels can collect a significant amount of energy.

Solar cell efficiency

Of course the underlying power conversion efficiency of a photovoltaic cell has a major influence on the end result, regardless of whether tracking is employed or not. Of particular relevance to the benefits of tracking are the following:

Temperature
Photovoltaic solar cell efficiency decreases with increasing temperature, at the rate of about 0.4%/°C. For example, 20% higher efficiency at 10 °C in early morning or winter as compared with 60 °C in the heat of the day or summer. Therefore, trackers can deliver additional benefit by collecting early morning and winter energy when the cells are operating at their highest efficiency.

Summary
Trackers for concentrating collectors must employ high-accuracy tracking so as to keep the collector at the focus point.

Trackers for non-concentrating flat-panel do not need high accuracy tracking:
 low power loss: under 10% loss even at 25° misalignment
 reflectance consistent even to around 50° misalignment
 diffuse sunlight contributes 10% independent of orientation, and a larger proportion on cloudy days

The benefits of tracking non-concentrating flat-panel collectors flow from the following:
 power loss degrades rapidly beyond about 30° misalignment
 significant power is available even when the Sun is very close to the horizon, e.g. around 60% of full power at 15° above the horizon, around 50% at 10°, and even 25% at only 5° above the horizon – of particular relevance at high latitudes and/or during the winter months
 photovoltaic panels are around 20% more efficient in the cool of the early mornings as compared with during the heat of the day; similarly, they are more efficient in winter than summer – and to effectively capture early morning and winter sun requires tracking.

Types of solar collector
Solar collectors may be:
 non-concentrating flat-panels, usually photovoltaic or hot-water,
 concentrating systems, of a variety of types.

Solar collector mounting systems may be fixed (manually aligned) or tracking. Different types of solar collector and their location (latitude) require different types of tracking mechanism. Tracking systems may be configured as:
 Fixed collector / moving mirror – i.e. Heliostat
 Moving collector

Non-tracking fixed mount
Residential and small-capacity commercial or industrial rooftop solar panels and solar water heater panels are usually fixed, often flush-mounted on an appropriately facing pitched roof. Advantages of fixed mounts over trackers include the following:
 Mechanical Advantages: Simple to manufacture, lower installation and maintenance costs.
 Wind-loading: it is easier and cheaper to provision a sturdy mount; all mounts other than fixed flush-mounted panels must be carefully designed having regard to wind loading due to greater exposure.
 Indirect light: approximately 10% of the incident solar radiation is diffuse light, available at any angle of misalignment with the Sun.
 Tolerance to misalignment: effective collection area for a flat-panel is relatively insensitive to quite high levels of misalignment with the Sun – see table and diagram at Basic concept section above – for example even a 25° misalignment reduces the direct solar energy collected by less than 10%.

Fixed mounts are usually used in conjunction with non-concentrating systems, however an important class of non-tracking concentrating collectors, of particular value in the 3rd world, are portable solar cookers. These use relatively low levels of concentration, typically around 2 to 8 Suns and are manually aligned.

Trackers
Even though a fixed flat-panel can be set to collect a high proportion of available noon-time energy, significant power is also available in the early mornings and late afternoons when the misalignment with a fixed panel becomes excessive to collect a reasonable proportion of the available energy. For example, even when the Sun is only 10° above the horizon the available energy can be around half the noon-time energy levels (or even greater depending on latitude, season, and atmospheric conditions).

Thus the primary benefit of a tracking system is to collect solar energy for the longest period of the day, and with the most accurate alignment as the Sun's position shifts with the seasons.

In addition, the greater the level of concentration employed, the more important accurate tracking becomes, because the proportion of energy derived from direct radiation is higher, and the region where that concentrated energy is focused becomes smaller.

Fixed collector / moving mirror

Many collectors cannot be moved, for example high-temperature collectors where the energy is recovered as hot liquid or gas (e.g. steam). Other examples include direct heating and lighting of buildings and fixed in-built solar cookers, such as Scheffler reflectors. In such cases it is necessary to employ a moving mirror so that, regardless of where the Sun is positioned in the sky, the Sun's rays are redirected onto the collector.

Due to the complicated motion of the Sun across the sky, and the level of precision required to correctly aim the Sun's rays onto the target, a heliostat mirror generally employs a dual axis tracking system, with at least one axis mechanized. In different applications, mirrors may be flat or concave.

Moving collector
Trackers can be grouped into classes by the number and orientation of the tracker's axes. Compared to a fixed mount, a single axis tracker increases annual output by approximately 30%, and a dual axis tracker an additional 10–20%.

Photovoltaic trackers can be classified into two types: standard photovoltaic (PV) trackers and concentrated photovoltaic (CPV) trackers. Each of these tracker types can be further categorized by the number and orientation of their axes, their actuation architecture and drive type, their intended applications, their vertical supports and foundation.

Floating mount
Floating islands of solar panels are being installed on reservoirs and lakes in the Netherlands, China, the UK and Japan. The sun-tracking system controlling the direction of the panels operates automatically according to the time of year, changing position by means of ropes attached to buoys.

Floating ground mount
Solar trackers can be built using a "floating" foundation, which sits on the ground without the need for invasive concrete foundations. Instead of placing the tracker on concrete foundations, the tracker is placed on a gravel pan that can be filled with a variety of materials, such as sand or gravel, to secure the tracker to the ground. These "floating" trackers can sustain the same wind load as a traditional fixed mounted tracker. The use of floating trackers increases the number of potential sites for commercial solar projects since they can be placed on top of capped landfills or in areas where excavated foundations are not feasible.

Motion Free Optical Tracking 
Solar trackers can be built without the need for mechanical tracking equipment. These are called motion free optical tracking, there has been some series of advancements in this technology over the past few decades. Renkube pioneered a glass based design to redirect light using motion free optical tracking technology.

Non-concentrating photovoltaic (PV) trackers 
Photovoltaic panels accept both direct and diffuse light from the sky. The panels on standard photovoltaic trackers gather both the available direct and diffuse light. The tracking functionality in standard photovoltaic trackers is used to minimize the angle of incidence between incoming light and the photovoltaic panel. This increases the amount of energy gathered from the direct component of the incoming sunlight.

The physics behind standard photovoltaic (PV) trackers works with all standard photovoltaic module technologies. These include all types of crystalline silicon panels (either mono-Si, or multi-Si) and all types of thin film panels (amorphous silicon, CdTe, CIGS, microcrystalline).

Concentrator photovoltaic (CPV) trackers

The optics in CPV modules accept the direct component of the incoming light and therefore must be oriented appropriately to maximize the energy collected. In low concentration applications a portion of the diffuse light from the sky can also be captured. The tracking functionality in CPV modules is used to orient the optics such that the incoming light is focused to a photovoltaic collector.

CPV modules that concentrate in one dimension must be tracked normal to the Sun in one axis. CPV modules that concentrate in two dimensions must be tracked normal to the Sun in two axes.

Accuracy requirements

The physics behind CPV optics requires that tracking accuracy increase as the systems concentration ratio increases. However, for a given concentration, nonimaging optics provide the widest possible acceptance angles, which may be used to reduce tracking accuracy.

In typical high concentration systems tracking accuracy must be in the ± 0.1° range to deliver approximately 90% of the rated power output. In low concentration systems, tracking accuracy must be in the ± 2.0° range to deliver 90% of the rated power output. As a result, high accuracy tracking systems are typical.

Technologies supported

Concentrated photovoltaic trackers are used with refractive and reflective based concentrator systems. There are a range of emerging photovoltaic cell technologies used in these systems. These range from conventional, crystalline silicon-based photovoltaic receivers to germanium-based triple junction receivers.

Single axis trackers
Single axis trackers have one degree of freedom that acts as an axis of rotation. The axis of rotation of single axis trackers is typically aligned along a true North meridian. It is possible to align them in any cardinal direction with advanced tracking algorithms. There are several common implementations of single axis trackers. These include horizontal single axis trackers (HSAT), horizontal single axis tracker with tilted modules (HTSAT), vertical single axis trackers (VSAT), tilted single axis trackers (TSAT) and polar aligned single axis trackers (PSAT). The orientation of the module with respect to the tracker axis is important when modeling performance. to learn more how they work https://solarearthinc.com/single-axis-solar-tracker/

Horizontal

Horizontal single axis tracker (HSAT)

The axis of rotation for horizontal single axis tracker is horizontal with respect to the ground.
The posts at either end of the axis of rotation of a horizontal single axis tracker can be shared between trackers to lower the installation cost. This type of solar tracker is most appropriate for low latitude regions. Field layouts with horizontal single axis trackers are very flexible. The simple geometry means that keeping all of the axes of rotation parallel to one another is all that is required for appropriately positioning the trackers with respect to one another. Appropriate spacing can maximize the ratio of energy production to cost, this being dependent upon local terrain and shading conditions and the time-of-day value of the energy produced. Backtracking is one means of computing the disposition of panels. Horizontal trackers typically have the face of the module oriented parallel to the axis of rotation. As a module tracks, it sweeps a cylinder that is rotationally symmetric around the axis of rotation. In single axis horizontal trackers, a long horizontal tube is supported on bearings mounted upon pylons or frames. The axis of the tube is on a north–south line. Panels are mounted upon the tube, and the tube will rotate on its axis to track the apparent motion of the Sun through the day.

Horizontal single axis tracker with tilted modules (HTSAT)

In HSAT, the modules are mounted flat at 0 degrees, while in HTSAT, the modules are installed at a certain tilt. It works on same principle as HSAT, keeping the axis of tube horizontal in north–south line and rotates the solar modules east to west throughout the day. These trackers are usually suitable in high latitude locations but does not take as much land space as consumed by Vertical single axis tracker (VSAT). Therefore, it brings the advantages of VSAT in a horizontal tracker and minimizes the overall cost of solar project.

Vertical

Vertical single axis tracker (VSAT)

The axis of rotation for vertical single axis trackers is vertical with respect to the ground. These trackers rotate from East to West over the course of the day. Such trackers are more effective at high latitudes than are horizontal axis trackers. Field layouts must consider shading to avoid unnecessary energy losses and to optimize land use. Also optimization for dense packing is limited due to the nature of the shading over the course of a year. Vertical single axis trackers typically have the face of the module oriented at an angle with respect to the axis of rotation. As a module tracks, it sweeps a cone that is rotationally symmetric around the axis of rotation.

Tilted
Tilted single axis tracker (TSAT)

All trackers with axes of rotation between horizontal and vertical are considered tilted single axis trackers. Tracker tilt angles are often limited to reduce the wind profile and decrease the elevated end height. With backtracking, they can be packed without shading perpendicular to their axis of rotation at any density. However, the packing parallel to their axes of rotation is limited by the tilt angle and the latitude. Tilted single axis trackers typically have the face of the module oriented parallel to the axis of rotation. As a module tracks, it sweeps a cylinder that is rotationally symmetric around the axis of rotation.

Dual axis trackers
Dual axis trackers have two degrees of freedom that act as axes of rotation. These axes are typically normal to one another. The axis that is fixed with respect to the ground can be considered a primary axis. The axis that is referenced to the primary axis can be considered a secondary axis. There are several common implementations of dual axis trackers. They are classified by the orientation of their primary axes with respect to the ground. Two common implementations are tip-tilt dual axis trackers (TTDAT) and azimuth-altitude dual axis trackers (AADAT). The orientation of the module with respect to the tracker axis is important when modeling performance. Dual axis trackers typically have modules oriented parallel to the secondary axis of rotation. Dual axis trackers allow for optimum solar energy levels due to their ability to follow the Sun vertically and horizontally. No matter where the Sun is in the sky, dual axis trackers are able to angle themselves to be in direct contact with the Sun.

Tip–tilt

A tip–tilt dual axis tracker (TTDAT) is so-named because the panel array is mounted on the top of a pole. Normally the east–west movement is driven by rotating the array around the top of the pole. On top of the rotating bearing is a T- or H-shaped mechanism that provides vertical rotation of the panels and provides the main mounting points for the array. The posts at either end of the primary axis of rotation of a tip–tilt dual axis tracker can be shared between trackers to lower installation costs.

Other such TTDAT trackers have a horizontal primary axis and a dependent orthogonal axis. The vertical azimuthal axis is fixed. This allows for great flexibility of the payload connection to the ground mounted equipment because there is no twisting of the cabling around the pole.

Field layouts with tip–tilt dual axis trackers are very flexible. The simple geometry means that keeping the axes of rotation parallel to one another is all that is required for appropriately positioning the trackers with respect to one another. Normally the trackers would have to be positioned at fairly low density to avoid one tracker casting a shadow on others when the Sun is low in the sky. Tip-tilt trackers can make up for this by tilting closer to horizontal to minimize up-Sun shading and therefore maximize the total power being collected.

The axes of rotation of many tip–tilt dual axis trackers are typically aligned either along a true north meridian or an east–west line of latitude.

Given the unique capabilities of the Tip-Tilt configuration and the appropriate controller, totally automatic tracking is possible for use on portable platforms. The orientation of the tracker is of no importance and can be placed as needed.

Azimuth-altitude
An azimuth–altitude (or alt-azimuth) dual axis tracker (AADAT) has its primary axis (the azimuth axis) vertical to the ground. The secondary axis, often called elevation axis, is then typically normal to the primary axis. They are similar to tip-tilt systems in operation, but they differ in the way the array is rotated for daily tracking. Instead of rotating the array around the top of the pole, AADAT systems can use a large ring mounted on the ground with the array mounted on a series of rollers. The main advantage of this arrangement is the weight of the array is distributed over a portion of the ring, as opposed to the single loading point of the pole in the TTDAT. This allows AADAT to support much larger arrays. Unlike the TTDAT, however, the AADAT system cannot be placed closer together than the diameter of the ring, which may reduce the system density, especially considering inter-tracker shading.

Construction and (Self-)Build

As described later, the economical balance between cost of panel and tracker is not trivial. The steep drop in cost for solar panels in the early 2010s made it more challenging to find a sensible solution. As can be seen in the attached media files, most constructions use industrial and/or heavy materials unsuitable for small or craft workshops. Even commercial offers may have rather unsuitable solutions (a big rock) for stabilization. For a small (amateur/enthusiast) construction, following criteria have to be met: economy, stability of end product against elemental hazards, ease of handling materials and joinery.

Tracker type selection
The selection of tracker type is dependent on many factors including installation size, electric rates, government incentives, land constraints, latitude, and local weather.

Horizontal single axis trackers are typically used for large distributed generation projects and utility scale projects. The combination of energy improvement and lower product cost and lower installation complexity results in compelling economics in large deployments. In addition the strong afternoon performance is particularly desirable for large grid-tied photovoltaic systems so that production will match the peak demand time. Horizontal single axis trackers also add a substantial amount of productivity during the spring and summer seasons when the Sun is high in the sky. The inherent robustness of their supporting structure and the simplicity of the mechanism also result in high reliability which keeps maintenance costs low. Since the panels are horizontal, they can be compactly placed on the axle tube without danger of self-shading and are also readily accessible for cleaning.

A vertical axis tracker pivots only about a vertical axle, with the panels either vertical, at a fixed, adjustable, or tracked elevation angle. Such trackers with fixed or (seasonally) adjustable angles are suitable for high latitudes, where the apparent solar path is not especially high, but which leads to long days in summer, with the Sun traveling through a long arc.

Dual axis trackers are typically used in smaller residential installations and locations with very high government feed in tariffs.

Multi-mirror concentrating PV

This device uses multiple mirrors in a horizontal plane to reflect sunlight upward to a high temperature photovoltaic or other system requiring concentrated solar power. Structural problems and expense are greatly reduced since the mirrors are not significantly exposed to wind loads. Through the employment of a patented mechanism, only two drive systems are required for each device. Because of the configuration of the device it is especially suited for use on flat roofs and at lower latitudes. The units illustrated each produce approximately 200 peak DC watts.

A multiple mirror reflective system combined with a central power tower is employed at the Sierra SunTower, located in Lancaster, California. This generation plant operated by eSolar is scheduled to begin operations on 5 August 2009. This system, which uses multiple heliostats in a north–south alignment, uses pre-fabricated parts and construction as a way of decreasing startup and operating costs.

Drive types

Active tracker
Active trackers use motors and gear trains to perform solar tracking. They can use microprocessors and sensors, date and time-based algorithms, or a combination of both to detect the position of the sun. To control and manage the movement of these massive structures special slewing drives are designed and rigorously tested. The technologies used to direct the tracker are constantly evolving and recent developments at Google and Eternegy have included the use of wire-ropes and winches to replace some of the more costly and more fragile components.

Counter rotating slewing drives sandwiching a fixed angle support can be applied to create a "multi-axis" tracking method which eliminates rotation relative to longitudinal alignment. This method if placed on a column or pillar will generate more electricity than fixed PV and its PV array will never rotate into a parking lot drive lane. It will also allow for maximum solar generation in virtually any parking lot lane/row orientation, including circular or curvilinear.

Active two-axis trackers are also used to orient heliostats – movable mirrors that reflect sunlight toward the absorber of a central power station. As each mirror in a large field will have an individual orientation these are controlled programmatically through a central computer system, which also allows the system to be shut down when necessary.

Light-sensing trackers typically have two or more photosensors, such as photodiodes, configured differentially so that they output a null when receiving the same light flux. Mechanically, they should be omnidirectional (i.e. flat) and are aimed 90 degrees apart. This will cause the steepest part of their cosine transfer functions to balance at the steepest part, which translates into maximum sensitivity. For more information about controllers see active daylighting.

Since the motors consume energy, one wants to use them only as necessary. So instead of a continuous motion, the heliostat is moved in discrete steps. Also, if the light is below some threshold there would not be enough power generated to warrant reorientation. This is also true when there is not enough difference in light level from one direction to another, such as when clouds are passing overhead. Consideration must be made to keep the tracker from wasting energy during cloudy periods.

Passive tracker

The most common Passive trackers use a low boiling point compressed gas fluid that is driven to one side or the other (by solar heat creating gas pressure) to cause the tracker to move in response to an imbalance. As this is a non-precision orientation it is unsuitable for certain types of concentrating photovoltaic collectors but works fine for common PV panel types. These will have viscous dampers to prevent excessive motion in response to wind gusts. Shader/reflectors are used to reflect early morning sunlight to "wake up" the panel and tilt it toward the Sun, which can take some hours dependent on shading conditions. The time to do this can be greatly reduced by adding a self-releasing tiedown that positions the panel slightly past the zenith (so that the fluid does not have to overcome gravity) and using the tiedown in the evening. (A slack-pulling spring will prevent release in windy overnight conditions.)

A newly emerging type of passive tracker for photovoltaic solar panels uses a hologram behind stripes of photovoltaic cells so that sunlight passes through the transparent part of the module and reflects on the hologram. This allows sunlight to hit the cell from behind, thereby increasing the module's efficiency. Also, the panel does not have to move since the hologram always reflects sunlight from the correct angle towards the cells.

Manual tracking
In some developing nations, drives have been replaced by operators who adjust the trackers. This has the benefits of robustness, having staff available for maintenance and creating employment for the population in the vicinity of the site.

Rotating buildings
In Freiburg im Breisgau, Germany, Rolf Disch built the Heliotrop in 1996, a residential building that is rotating with the sun and has an additional dual axis photovoltaic sail on the roof. It's producing four times the amount of energy the building consumes.

The Gemini house is a unique example of a vertical axis tracker. This cylindrical house in Austria (latitude above 45 degrees north) rotates in its entirety to track the Sun, with vertical solar panels mounted on one side of the building, rotating independently, allowing control of the natural heating from the Sun.

ReVolt House is a rotating, floating house designed by TU Delft students for the Solar Decathlon Europe competition in Madrid. The house was completed in September 2012. An opaque façade turns itself towards the Sun in summer to prevent the interior from heating up. In winter, a glass façade faces the Sun for passive solar heating of the house. Since the house is floating frictionless on water, rotating it does not require much energy.

Disadvantages
Trackers add cost and maintenance to the system – if they add 25% to the cost, and improve the output by 25%, the same performance can be obtained by making the system 25% larger, eliminating the additional maintenance. Tracking was very cost effective in the past when photovoltaic modules were expensive compared to today. Because they were expensive, it was important to use tracking to minimize the number of panels used in a system with a given power output. But as panels get cheaper, the cost effectiveness of tracking vs using a greater number of panels decreases. However, in off-grid installations where batteries store power for overnight use, a tracking system reduces the hours that stored energy is used thus requiring less battery capacity. As the batteries themselves are expensive (either traditional lead acid stationary cells or newer lithium ion batteries), their cost needs to be included in the cost analysis.

Tracking is also not suitable for typical residential rooftop photovoltaic installations. Since tracking requires that panels tilt or otherwise move, provisions must be made to allow this. This requires that panels be offset a significant distance from the roof, which requires expensive racking and increases wind load. Also, such a setup would not make for a very aesthetically pleasing install on residential rooftops. Because of this (and the high cost of such a system), tracking is not used on residential rooftop installations, and is unlikely to ever be used in such installations. This is especially true as the cost of photovoltaic modules continues to decrease, which makes increasing the number of modules for more power the more cost-effective option. Tracking can (and sometimes is) used for residential ground mount installations, where greater freedom of movement is possible.

Tracking can also cause shading problems. As the panels move during the course of the day, it is possible that, if the panels are located too close to one another, they may shade one another due to profile angle effects. As an example, if you have several panels in a row from east to west, there will be no shading during solar noon. But in the afternoon, panels could be shaded by their west neighboring panel if they are sufficiently close. This means that panels must be spaced sufficiently far to prevent shading in systems with tracking, which can reduce the available power from a given area during the peak Sun hours. This is not a big problem if there is sufficient land area to widely space the panels. But it will reduce output during certain hours of the day (i.e. around solar noon) compared to a fixed array. Optimizing this problem with math is called backtracking.

Further, single-axis tracking systems are prone to become unstable at relatively modest wind speeds (galloping). This is due to torsional instability of single-axis solar tracking systems.  Anti-galloping measures such as automatic stowing and external dampers must be implemented.

See also
 Air mass coefficient
 Heliostat
 Solar energy
 Sun path

References

Solar energy
Tracking
Photovoltaics